František Čermák and Michal Mertiňák were the defending champion, but they decided not to participate together. Čermák played alongside Filip Polášek, but lost in the first round to Rameez Junaid and Philipp Marx.  Mertiňák teamed up with André Sá, but lost in the quarterfinals to Victor Baluda and Konstantin Kravchuk. 
Mikhail Elgin and Denis Istomin won the title, defeating Ken Skupski and Neal Skupski in the final, 6–2, 1–6, [14–12].

Seeds

Draw

Draw

References
 Main Draw

2013 Men's Doubles
Kremlin Cup - Doubles